Tomasz Ptak (born 9 February 1992 in Braniewo) is an inactive Polish footballer who is currently signed to Zatoka Braniewo. He joined the Polish Land Forces in 2016 and was assigned to duty in Latvia following the 2020—2021 season.

Football career
Zatoka Braniewo was his first youth team; he was admitted to MSP Szamotuły football academy in 2007, where he worked with goalkeeping coach Andrzej Dawidziuk, who he credits with being an early inspiration. He played for Sparta Szamotuły during the 2009—2010 season; on 28 October 2009, he played 90 minutes for Poland's U17 team against Bulgaria. He briefly played for Górnik Konin in fall 2010 before returning to Sparta and playing as first goalkeeper. His debut came on 1 October 2011; Jaga defeated Zagłębie Lubin. He was relegated back to Young Ekstraklasa after Grzegorz Sandomierski returned from playing abroad. In 2011, he was flown to England to train with Liverpool F.C. goalkeepers for 8 days.

When he returned, he signed a four-year contract with Jagiellonia Białystok. In summer 2012, he went to Stomil on loan, where he played 17 games and remained until November. In the short break period between leaving Stomil and returning to Jaga, Ptak played in a friendly Poland U21 match against Bosnia and Herzegovina. In 2013, he was loaned to Motor Lublin on a six-month contract. At the end of the summer, he left Jaga to sign a three-year contract with Zagłębie Lubin, where he was placed on the reserve team. Prior to signing with Lubin, he attended training camp for Wisła Płock. He stayed in Lubin until 2015 and played 8 games total. At this time, he was pursued by Olimpia but ultimately returned to Zakota Braniewo to play for his home club. Zakota played in the 2017 Polish championships.

In 2016, Ptak joined the Polish Land Forces and in 2021, he left Zakota to deploy to Latvia as part of the NATO Enhanced Forward Presence campaign. It is unclear if he will be returning to Zakota by spring 2022.

Personal life
Ptak was born 9 February 1992 in Braniewo, Warmia-Mazury Province, Poland and is a lifelong Liverpool F.C. and Jerzy Dudek fan. He thinks goalkeeper training is lacking and wants to be a goalkeeper coach after he retires from playing.

References

External links
 

1992 births
People from Braniewo
Living people
Polish footballers
Association football goalkeepers
Jagiellonia Białystok players
OKS Stomil Olsztyn players
Motor Lublin players
Zagłębie Lubin players
Ekstraklasa players
Sportspeople from Warmian-Masurian Voivodeship